Seán Curran may refer to:
 Seán Curran (dancer), American dancer and choreographer
 Seán Curran (hurler) (born 1991), Irish hurler
 Sean Curran (scientist), assistant professor in gerontology
 Sean Curran (politician) (born 1977), American politician in Massachusetts